Yorkshire Division One is an English rugby union division, the seventh tier of the domestic competition, and the top level for local rugby union in parts of Yorkshire. The champions are automatically promoted to North 1 East, a division with a wider geographical area that also encompasses northeast England. The runners-up participate in a playoff against the 2nd place team from the equivalent regional league, Durham/Northumberland 1, for promotion to North 1 East. The bottom two clubs are relegated to Yorkshire 2.

Each season a team from Yorkshire 1 is picked to take part in the RFU Intermediate Cup - a national competition for clubs at level 7.

2021–22 season

The teams competing in 2021-22 achieved their places in the league based on performances in 2019-20, the 'previous season' column in the table below refers to that season not 2020-21.

2020–21 season

On 30 October 2020 the RFU announced  that due to the coronavirus pandemic a decision had been taken to cancel Adult Competitive Leagues (National League 1 and below) for the 2020/21 season meaning Yorkshire 1 was not contested.

2019–20 season

2018–19 season

2017–18 season

2016–17 season

Acklam (transferred from Durham/Northumberland 1)
Beverley (relegated from North 1 East)
Bradford Salem
Bridlington
Heath
Hullensians
Keighley (promoted from Yorkshire 2)
North Ribblesdale
Old Brodleians
Scarborough
Selby
West Leeds (promoted from Yorkshire 2)
Yarnbury
York

2015–16 season

2014–15 season
Bridlington
Doncaster Phoenix
Heath	
Hullensians (promoted from Yorkshire 2)
Malton & Norton (relegated from North 1 East)
Middlesbrough (relegated from North 1 East)
North Ribblesdale
Old Brodleians
Pontefract
Scarborough	
Selby
Wath Upon Dearne
Yarnbury (promoted from Yorkshire 2)
York

2013–14 season
Acklam	
Bridlington
Dinnington
Doncaster Phoenix (promoted from Yorkshire 2)
Heath
Ilkley
Keighley (relegated from North 1 East)	
North Ribblesdale
Old Brodleians
Pontefract
Scarborough
Selby (promoted from Yorkshire 2)
Wath Upon Dearne
York

2012–13 season
Barnsley
Bridlington
Dinnington
Driffield
Heath
Huddersfield YMCA
Ilkley
Knottingley
North Ribblesdale
Old Brodleians
Pontefract
Scarborough
Wath Upon Dearne
York

Original teams
When league rugby began in 1987 this division contained the following teams:

Bramley
Castleford 
Cleckheaton
Driffield
Goole
Hemsworth
Moortown
Roundhegians
Scarborough
West Park Bramhope
York Railway Institute

Yorkshire 1 honours

Yorkshire 1 (1987–1993)

The original Yorkshire 1 was a tier 9 league with promotion up to North East 2 and relegation down to Yorkshire 2.

Yorkshire 1 (1993–2000)

The creation of National 5 North for the 1993–94 season meant that Yorkshire 1 dropped to become a tier 10 league.  A further restructure at the end of the 1995–96 season, which included the cancellation of National 5 North and the addition of North East 3 at tier 9, saw Yorkshire 1 remain at tier 10 with promotion to the new North 3 East league.

Yorkshire 1 (2000–present)

Northern league restructuring by the RFU at the end of the 1999-2000 season saw the cancellation of North East 1, North East 2 and North East 3 (tiers 7-9).  This meant that Yorkshire 1 became a tier 7 league, with promotion to North 2 East (currently North 1 East).

Promotion play-offs
Since the 2000–01 season there has been a play-off between the runners-up of Durham/Northumberland 1 and Yorkshire 1 for the third and final promotion place to North 1 East. The team with the superior league record has home advantage in the tie.  At the end of the 2019–20 season Yorkshire 1 teams have been the most successful with thirteen wins to the Durham/Northumberland 1 teams six; and the home side have won ten times to the away sides nine.

Number of league titles

Bridlington (2)
Driffield (2)
Malton & Norton (2)
Old Brodleians (2)
Pocklington (2)
Wheatley Hills (2)
Beverley (1)
Bradford & Bingley (1)
Bradford Salem (1)
Bramley (1)
Bridlington Mariners (1)
Cleckheaton (1)
Doncaster Phoenix (1)
Goole (1)
Huddersfield Y.M.C.A. (1)
Hull (1)
Ilkley (1)
Moortown (1)
North Ribblesdale (1)
Pocklington (1)
Pontefract (1)
Roundhegians (1)
Sandal (1)
Sheffield Tigers (1)
West Leeds (1)
West Park Bramhope (1)
Yarnbury (1)
York (1)

Notes

See also
Yorkshire RFU
English rugby union system
Rugby union in England

References

7
Rugby union competitions in Yorkshire